The 1963 season was the second season of national competitive association football in Australia and 80th overall.

Cup competitions

Australia Cup

The competition began on 8 September 1963. Twenty-five clubs had entered the competition with the final two clubs Port Melbourne Slavia and Polonia Melbourne qualifying for the Final. The Final ended in a 0–0 draw with Port Melbourne Slavia winning the replay 3–2, with a hat-trick from Des Palmer.

Final

Replay

References

External links
 Football Federation Australia official website

1963 in Australian soccer
Seasons in Australian soccer